2-Chloroethanol (also called ethylene chlorohydrin or glycol chlorohydrin) is an organic chemical compound with the chemical formula HOCH2CH2Cl and the simplest beta-halohydrin (chlorohydrin). This colorless liquid has a pleasant ether-like odor. It is miscible with water. The molecule is bifunctional, consisting of both an alkyl chloride and an alcohol functional group.

Synthesis and applications
2-Chloroethanol is produced by treating ethylene with hypochlorous acid: 

2-Chloroethanol was once produced on a large scale as a precursor to ethylene oxide:

HOCH2CH2Cl + NaOH → C2H4O + NaCl + H2O

This application has been supplanted by the more economic direct oxidation of ethylene. Otherwise chloroethanol is still used in the production of pharmaceuticals, biocides, and plasticizers. Many of these applications entail its use in installing 2-hydroxyethyl groups. Several dyes are prepared by the alkylation of aniline derivatives with chloroethanol. It is also used for manufacture of thiodiglycol.

It is a solvent for cellulose acetate and ethyl cellulose, textile printing dyes, in dewaxing, refining of rosin, extraction of pine lignin, and the cleaning of machines.

Environmental aspects
Chloroethanol is a metabolite in the degradation of 1,2-dichloroethane. The alcohol is then further oxidized via chloroacetaldehyde to chloroacetate. This metabolic pathway is topical since billions of kilograms of 1,2-dichloroethane are processed annually as a precursor to vinyl chloride.

Safety
Like most organochlorine compounds, chloroethanol releases hydrochloric acid and phosgene when burned.

In regards to dermal exposure to 2-chloroethanol, the Occupational Safety and Health Administration has set a permissible exposure limit of 5ppm (16mg/m3) over an eight-hour time-weighted average, while the National Institute for Occupational Safety and Health has a more protective recommended exposure limit of a 1ppm (3mg/m3) exposure ceiling.

It is classified as an extremely hazardous substance in the United States as defined in Section 302 of the U.S. Emergency Planning and Community Right-to-Know Act (42 U.S.C. 11002), and is subject to strict reporting requirements by facilities which produce, store, or use it in significant quantities.

References

Primary alcohols
Organochlorides
Chloroethyl compounds
Chloroethanols